Santa Teresa d'Avila is a church on the Corso d'Italia in Rome, Italy. It is dedicated to Teresa of Avila.

History
It was founded by Cardinal Girolamo Gotti in 1901, designed in a Romanesque-Gothic hybrid style by Tullio Passarelli.  In 1906 Pope Pius X made it a parish church and granted it to the Discalced Carmelites, who still have a generalate by the church and serve the church and its convent and parochial centre.  Pope Pius XII elevated it to the status of basilica in 1951, and eleven years later Pope John XXIII made it a titular church, with Cardinal Giovanni Panico as its first titular cardinal. 

The tympanum above the main entrance door depicts Saint Teresa being blessed by Christ. The interior is decorated with works by 20th-century Roman artists, including a statue of Saint Teresa above the high altar.

Burials
Raffaele Rossi

Cardinal-priests
 Giovanni Panico (1962)
 Joseph-Marie Martin (1965–1976)
 László Lékai (1976–1986) 
 László Paskai, O.F.M. (1988–2015)
 Maurice Piat, C.S.Sp. (2016–present)

External links
 (Official website)

Teresa
Teresa Corso
Discalced Carmelite Order
Rome Q. III Pinciano
Roman Catholic churches completed in 1901
20th-century Roman Catholic church buildings in Italy